William Ernest Newbould (11 May 1880 – 27 July 1968) was an Australian rules footballer who played with South Melbourne in the Victorian Football League (VFL).

Notes

External links 

1880 births
1968 deaths
Australian rules footballers from Victoria (Australia)
Sydney Swans players